IROC XII was the twelfth year of IROC competition took place in 1988. It saw the use of the Chevrolet Camaro in all races, and continued the format introduced in IROC VIII. Race one took place on the Daytona International Speedway, race two took place at Riverside International Raceway, race three ran at Michigan International Speedway, and race four concluded the year at Watkins Glen International. Al Unser Jr. won his second championship and $211,900.

The roster of drivers and final points standings were as follows:

Race results

Race One, Daytona International Speedway
Friday, February 12, 1988

(5) Indicates 5 bonus points added to normal race points scored for leading the most laps.(3) Indicates 3 bonus points added to normal race points scored for leading the 2nd most laps (did not occur in this race so not awarded).(2) Indicates 2 bonus points added to normal race points scored for leading the 3rd most laps (did not occur in this race so not awarded).

Average speed: Cautions: 1Margin of victory: 2 clLead changes: 0

Race Two, Riverside International Raceway
Saturday, June 11, 1988

(5) Indicates 5 bonus points added to normal race points scored for leading the most laps.(3) Indicates 3 bonus points added to normal race points scored for leading the 2nd most laps(2) Indicates 2 bonus points added to normal race points scored for leading the 3rd most laps (did not occur in this race so not awarded).

Average speed: Cautions: 2Margin of victory: 2 secLead changes: 1
Lap Leader Breakdown

Race Three, Michigan International Speedway
Saturday, August 6, 1988 

(5) Indicates 5 bonus points added to normal race points scored for leading the most laps.(3) Indicates 3 bonus points added to normal race points scored for leading the 2nd most laps(2) Indicates 2 bonus points added to normal race points scored for leading the 3rd most laps (did not occur in this race so not awarded).

Average speed: Cautions: noneMargin of victory: 0.78 secLead changes: 1
Lap Leader Breakdown

Race Four, Watkins Glen International
Saturday, August 13, 1988

(5) Indicates 5 bonus points added to normal race points scored for leading the most laps.(3) Indicates 3 bonus points added to normal race points scored for leading the 2nd most laps (did not occur in this race so not awarded).(2) Indicates 2 bonus points added to normal race points scored for leading the 3rd most laps (did not occur in this race so not awarded).

Average speed: Cautions: 3Margin of victory: 1.58 secLead changes: 0

Notes
 Dale Earnhardt and Geoff Bodine tied for fifth place in the championship standings, but Earnhardt was awarded the position due to a higher finishing position in the final race.

References

External links
IROC XII History - IROC Website

International Race of Champions
1988 in American motorsport